Lom is a municipality in Innlandet county, Norway. It is located in the traditional district of Gudbrandsdal. The administrative centre of the municipality is the village of Fossbergom. Another village area in Lom is Elvesæter.

The  municipality is the 38th largest by area out of the 356 municipalities in Norway. Lom is the 266th most populous municipality in Norway with a population of 2,211.

Lom is famous for its extensive history, for Lom Stave Church, one of the few remaining stave churches in Norway. Also for being located in the midst of the highest mountains in Northern Europe.

General information
The prestegjeld (parish) of Lom was established as a municipality on 1 January 1838 (see formannskapsdistrikt law). On 1 January 1866, the western district of Lom (population: 2,691) was separated and established as the new municipality of Skiaker. Afterwards, the remaining part of Lom had 3,299 residents. The boundaries of Lom have not changed since that time.

Name 
The municipality was named Lom after the old Lom farm where the Lom Stave Church is located. The Old Norse form of the name was Lóar (nominative case) and Lóm (dative case). The name is the plural form of ló which means "meadow".

Coat of arms
The coat of arms was granted on 6 February 1987. The arms show three silver-colored  (spades) on a blue background. These spades were historically used to scoop water from the irrigation channels typical for the area. The area is one of the driest in Norway, but the soil is good for agriculture. It thus needs irrigation. In the 17th century, a system was developed in which melting water from the mountains was transported to the area using wooden channels or aqueducts. The water was further divided using irrigation channels.

Churches
The Church of Norway has three parishes within the municipality of Lom. It is part of the Nord-Gudbrandsdal prosti (deanery) in the Diocese of Hamar.

History 

An ancient trade route passed up from Sunnmøre through Lom and Skjåk and down the Gudbrandsdalen valley into Eastern Norway. The trade consisted of fish and salt heading inland, and grain heading to the coast.

The Saga of Olaf Haraldson relates that St. Olaf commented as he first looked down on Lom, "What a pity to have to lay waste to such a beautiful valley." In the face of such a clear motivation, the residents of the valley converted (it has since been a recurring discussion whether he looked to Lom or the neighbouring municipality Skjåk, at the time a part of Lom.) St. Olafs-stuggu, a building where St. Olaf is reported to have spent a night in 1021, can still be found here. The building is part of the Presthaugen District Museum.

Lom Stave Church, which is located in Fossbergom, is believed to have been built in 1158, making 2008 the 850th anniversary. It was enlarged in 1634, with further addition of two naves in 1667. It is believed that the church was originally surrounded by a circumambulatory passage, like many other Norwegian stave churches, but that this passage was removed when the two side wings were added. A few Runic inscriptions can be still be seen in the church. The church also contains numerous paintings from the 17th and 18th centuries with religious motifs. Many of the paintings were made by local artist Eggert Munch, a distant relation of the famous Edvard Munch. The church also contains numerous examples of local woodcarving, as seen in the elaborate acanthus scrolls adorning the pulpit. Carved dragon figures on the roof are old symbols of protection against evil.
It is still in use as the local church.

The Garmo Stave Church, which was built around 1150, has been relocated from Lom municipality and is now at Maihaugen in Lillehammer. It was replaced with a new Garmo Church.

During the 1940 Norwegian Campaign German prisoners of war were kept by the Norwegian Army at Lom prisoner of war camp. Lom was bombed twice by the German Luftwaffe in April 1940.

Government
All municipalities in Norway, including Lom, are responsible for primary education (through 10th grade), outpatient health services, senior citizen services, unemployment and other social services, zoning, economic development, and municipal roads. The municipality is governed by a municipal council of elected representatives, which in turn elects a mayor.  The municipality falls under the Vestre Innlandet District Court and the Eidsivating Court of Appeal.

Municipal council
The municipal council  of Lom is made up of 17 representatives that are elected to four year terms. The party breakdown of the council is as follows:

Mayors
The mayors of Lom (incomplete list):
1996-1999: Jarmund Øyen (Ap)
1999-2003: Magnar Mundhjeld (LL)
2003-2011: Simen Bjørgen (Sp)
2011–present: Bjarne Eiolf Holø (Sp)

Geography 

Lom is the "gateway" to the Jotunheimen Mountains and to Jotunheim National Park.

Lom is bordered on the northwest by the municipality of Skjåk, in the north by Lesja, in the east and southeast by Vågå, in the south by Vang all in Innlandet county. In the southwest, it is bordered by Luster municipality in Vestland county.

Climate 
The climate is very continental by Norwegian standards. The large mountain areas in Lom are much colder and have more precipitation; snowy weather is possible even in summer at altitudes above . Agriculture has for centuries used irrigation.

Economy 
Agriculture has long been important in Lom. The natural environment and history of this mountainous region also make Lom a tourist destination.

Notable residents 

 Jakob Klukstad (1705 in Lom – 1773) a Norwegian wood carver and painter
 Knut Hamsun (1859 in Lom – 1952) novelist, winner of the 1920 Nobel Prize in Literature. His childhood home can be seen 12 kilometers to the east of Lom center
 Erland Frisvold (1877 in Lom – 1971) politician and Army colonel
 Olav Aukrust (1883 in Lom – 1929) a poet and teacher, used Nynorsk. There is a memorial to him near the church
 Jørgine Boomer (1887 in Bøverdalen – 1971) a Norwegian-American rags-to-riches hotel manager
 Carl Gustav Sparre Olsen (1903–1984) a Norwegian violinist and composer, buried in Lom
 Tor Jonsson (1916 in Lom – 1951), poet and author and winner of The Norwegian Critics Prize for Literature. His childhood cottage is on the sunny-side road Solsidevegen
 Anstein Gjengedal (born 1944 in Lom) Chief of Police of Oslo, 2000/2012
 Arne Brimi (born 1957) a Norwegian chef and food writer
 Vidar Johansen (born 1953) a Norwegian jazz musician, music arranger and composer; since 2015 lives on a mountain farm in Lom
 Morten Schakenda (1966 – 2022) a Norwegian cook

Attractions 

 Lom Stave Church
 Jotunheim National Park
 Norsk Fjellmuseum, the Norwegian Mountain Museum and information center for Jotunheim National Park
 Lom District Museum in Presthaugen – an open-air museum
 Fossheim Stone/Mineral Center
 County Route 55 (known as the Sognefjellsvegen) from Lom over the Sognefjell (the highest mountain pass in Northern Europe)
 Knut Hamsun's cottage located at Garmostrædet
 The Sagasøyla Column in Bøverdalen
 Steinahøfjellet 
 Lom's irrigation canals

See also 
Bjørn Turtums gammeldansorkester

References

External links 

Municipal fact sheet from Statistics Norway 

Jotunheimen National Park

 
Municipalities of Innlandet
1838 establishments in Norway